Megalytoceratinae is a subfamily of lytoceratids ammonites consisting of planulate forms, i.e. those with moderately evolute compressed shells with bluntly rounded venters, in which the outer whorls become smooth and sutures tend to resemble those of the Perisphinctidae.  The family includes three genera, Megalytoceras, and Metrolytoceras, from the  Middle Bajocian of England, Perilytoceras from the Toarcian and a fourth possible member, Asapholytoceras, from the Toacian of southeastern Europe.

References

W.J.Arkell, B.Kummel, & C.W.Wright 1957. Mesozoic Ammonoidea, Treatise on Invertebrate Paleontology, Part L Ammonoidea. R.C.Moore, (ed).

Jurassic ammonites
Toarcian first appearances
Middle Jurassic extinctions
Lytoceratidae